Pyrenaearia organiaca is a species of small air-breathing land snail, a terrestrial pulmonate gastropod mollusk in the family Hygromiidae, the hairy snails and their allies. This species is endemic to Spain.

References

Pyrenaearia
Endemic fauna of Spain
Gastropods described in 1905
Taxonomy articles created by Polbot